Karl Oscar Vilhelm Bengtsson (14 January 1885 – 13 October 1972) was a Swedish football player who competed in the 1908 Summer Olympics. In the 1908 tournament he was a part of the Swedish football team that finished in 4th place.

References

External links
 

1885 births
1972 deaths
Swedish footballers
Sweden international footballers
Olympic footballers of Sweden
Footballers at the 1908 Summer Olympics
Association football goalkeepers
Örgryte IS players